Miss Nuevo León is a pageant in Nuevo León, Mexico, that selects that state's representative for the national Miss Mexico pageant.

Titleholders
Below are the names of the annual titleholders of Miss Nuevo León, listed in ascending order, and their final placements in the Miss Mexico after their participation.

<small> Competes in Miss World.

External links
Official Website

See also
Nuestra Belleza Nuevo León
Miss Earth Nuevo León

Beauty pageants in Mexico
2016 establishments in Mexico
Nuevo León